Fabian-Herbert Burdenski (born 23 September 1991) is a German footballer who plays as a midfielder for FSV Frankfurt.

Club career
On 22 July 2014, it was announced that he signed for FSV Frankfurt on a one-year deal.

In summer 2017, he transferred to Korona Kielce in the Polish Ekstraklasa.

Burdenski re-joined FSV Frankfurt when he signed with the club again on 18 December 2018.

Personal life
He is the son of former German international goalkeeper Dieter Burdenski and grandchild of Herbert Burdenski who also was a German international.

References

External links
 
 
 Profile at fsv-frankfurt.de

1991 births
Living people
Footballers from Bremen
German footballers
Association football midfielders
FC Oberneuland players
VfB Oldenburg players
1. FC Magdeburg players
Wisła Kraków players
FSV Frankfurt players
FC Rot-Weiß Erfurt players
Korona Kielce players
SSV Jeddeloh players
Regionalliga players
Ekstraklasa players
3. Liga players
German expatriate footballers
German expatriate sportspeople in Poland
Expatriate footballers in Poland